The Philadelphia Phillies' 2009 season was the 127th season in the history of the franchise. The team, managed by Charlie Manuel, began their sixth season at Citizens Bank Park and defense of their 2008 World Series championship on April 5.  After collecting a third straight Eastern Division championship, the Phillies won their second consecutive National League pennant for the first time in franchise history; however they were defeated by the New York Yankees in the 2009 World Series.

The Phillies posted a second consecutive winning April to open the season with an 11–9 record, but the month was marred by the death of legendary broadcaster Harry Kalas. After opening the month of May against the rival New York Mets, the Phillies met President Barack Obama to celebrate their World Series victory the previous season, and had two rookie pitchers win consecutive starts for the first time since 2007. Starting pitcher Jamie Moyer earned his 250th career win during the month, while first baseman Ryan Howard and outfielder Raúl Ibañez became the first Phillies teammates to hit 10 home runs in the same month. Echoing their strong run in the middle of the 2008 season, the Phillies compiled a 16–4 record in late May and early June, which was countered by weakness during interleague play in late June.

After the team's largest victory of the season (22–1 over the Cincinnati Reds) in early July, five Phillies—Howard, Ibáñez, second baseman Chase Utley, and outfielders Shane Victorino and Jayson Werth—were selected to the All-Star team. July was the team's best showing of the season, as they compiled their first 20-win month since the 2001 season. The Phillies traded for starting pitcher Cliff Lee at the end of the month to bolster their starting rotation, who won his first five starts with the team, and signed free-agent pitcher Pedro Martínez. In August, Eric Bruntlett turned the first game-ending unassisted triple play in National League history, and the second in team history. The following month, the team clinched its third consecutive division championship on September 30, becoming the first Phillies team to make a third straight playoff appearance since the 1976–1978 Phillies.

Philadelphia defeated the Colorado Rockies in the National League Division Series (NLDS), 3–1, and the Los Angeles Dodgers in the National League Championship Series (NLCS) for the second consecutive year, 4–1. Howard was named the most valuable player of the NLCS. The Phillies were defeated by the Yankees in the World Series, four games to two.

Statistical leaders in batting for the 2009 team included Victorino (batting average, .292), Howard (home runs, 45; runs batted in, 141), and Utley (runs scored, 112). For his season accomplishments, Utley won his fourth consecutive Silver Slugger Award. Pitching leaders included right-handed starting pitcher Joe Blanton (innings pitched, ), left-handed starter  (win–loss record, 12–4), and relief pitcher Brad Lidge (saves, 31). Victorino and shortstop Jimmy Rollins also won Rawlings Gold Glove Awards for their play in the field.

Offseason

Departures
On November 4, following the World Series, the Phillies released third base coach Steve Smith. Smith had been with the team for two years. The Phillies were expected to have the remaining coaches to return for the 2009 season. However, bench coach Jimy Williams opted not to return to the Phillies for the 2009 season, notifying the team on November 10. Charlie Manuel had expected Williams to return for the 2009 season, and was surprised that he declined. However, Williams left the team on good terms, and Manuel stated that he was welcome to come back to the Phillies if he changed his mind. Left fielder Pat Burrell became a free agent at the end of the 2008 season, signing with the Tampa Bay Rays, whom the Phillies had defeated in the World Series, on January 5. The team did not tender an offer to Burrell following eight seasons. The Phillies also released outfielder So Taguchi on November 5. Taguchi had served as a pinch-hitter for the Phillies in 2008, and also replaced Burrell in left field some games. Eric Bruntlett replaced Taguchi for the latter half of the 2008 season. Relief pitcher Tom Gordon also filed for free agency, ultimately signing with the Arizona Diamondbacks.

Arrivals

On November 3, the Phillies named Rubén Amaro, Jr. to be the general manager after Pat Gillick retired at the end of a three-year contract. Amaro previously had a long history with the Phillies, serving as a bat boy in the 1980s, a player in the 1990s, and as assistant general manager for the Phillies from 1998 until his appointment as general manager. Gillick remained with the Phillies as an advisor. On November 13, Sam Perlozzo joined the Phillies as third base coach and fielding/infield coach after spending the 2008 season in the same position for the Seattle Mariners. Perlozzo previously served as the third base coach for the New York Mets, the Cincinnati Reds, and as third base coach, bench coach, and manager for the Baltimore Orioles. Another former manager, Pete Mackanin, was named the team's new bench coach on November 21; he had been interim manager for the Reds when Jerry Narron was fired in Cincinnati in 2007. On November 28, the Phillies signed Mike Koplove Koplove, a right-handed relief pitcher, was optioned to the AAA Lehigh Valley IronPigs at the end of spring training. On December 16, Raúl Ibañez agreed to play left field for the Phillies in a 3-year, $31.5 million deal. South Korean pitcher Chan Ho Park officially signed a one-year contract to join the Phillies on January 6, after agreeing to a deal in principle in December. Park was originally signed as an insurance policy for the bullpen, as reliever J. C. Romero was assigned a fifty-game suspension after violating the Major League Baseball drug policy, but won the fifth starter's job in Spring training.

Retentions
Left-handed reliever Scott Eyre re-signed with the Phillies after becoming a vital part of the bullpen during the stretch run. The Phillies re-signed left-handed starter Jamie Moyer on December 15 after lengthy negotiations. The 46-year-old Moyer was inked to a two-year contract to return to the world champions and kept a key part of the Phillies' postseason rotation intact. The team also avoided salary arbitration with first baseman Ryan Howard's three-year contract.

Injuries

On November 20, second baseman Chase Utley had hip surgery and was scheduled to be out for four to six months. However, on December 15, Utley said in a press conference that he could be ready for Opening Night. Just under four months later, Utley made his first pre-season game appearance in an intersquad game March 14, and his first appearance in actual game competition the next day against the St. Louis Cardinals. Third baseman Pedro Feliz also had surgery on his back to repair a herniated disc on the same day as Utley. Feliz officially returned to spring training action on March 13. During spring training, starting pitcher Cole Hamels left training camp on March 16 and flew to Philadelphia to have his left elbow examined by Dr. Michael Ciccotti. Hamels felt tightness in between innings and after he was done pitching for the day. "This will obviously set me back a couple of days, and I don’t think that should be a big deal", said Hamels. However, the injury threw his Opening Day start against the Braves into doubt, even though Ciccotti found no structural damage in his arm; Brett Myers was announced as Hamels' replacement to start Opening Night.

Spring training
On November 13, the Phillies announced their spring training schedule. In addition to their Grapefruit League games, the Phillies played two games against two of the World Baseball Classic teams. The Phillies defeated Team Canada (with Phillie Matt Stairs) on March 4, 9–2, and lost to Team USA (with Jimmy Rollins and Shane Victorino) on March 5, 9–6. The team broke camp April 2 and headed north to play two "On Deck Series" games on April 3 and 4 against the Tampa Bay Rays at Citizens Bank Park; they split the series, winning 3–2 and losing 9–7.

The Phillies finished the 2009 preseason with a record of 13–19, 10 games behind the Grapefruit League-leading New York Yankees. Ryan Howard led all players in Spring Training with 10 home runs. The team set spring training attendance-records for Bright House Field in 2009. They set a single-game record with 10,335 people in attendance on March 15 for a game against the St. Louis Cardinals. The Phillies set the franchise's total spring training attendance record for Bright House Field, with 133,620 attending in 2009.

Regular season

April

The Phillies began their 2009 season in front of a sold-out crowd of 44,532 at Citizens Bank Park on April 5, playing against the Atlanta Braves. The Phillies, originally scheduled to play in the afternoon of April 6, earned the distinction of playing the opening game of the entire 2009 Major League Baseball season after winning the 2008 World Series. They lost the opener 4–1 to the division-rival Braves, whose new ace, Derek Lowe, pitched eight shutout innings. The Phillies lost the next game, and were in danger of losing the following night and dropping to 0–3 before scoring eight runs in the bottom of the seventh inning for a 12–11 come-from-behind win. The Phillies lost their first game in Denver, but came from behind again in their next two games to take the second series from the Colorado Rockies. The Phillies defeated the Washington Nationals in the opener of their third series, just hours after the death of Hall of Fame broadcaster Harry Kalas, but lost the third scheduled game of the series after the second was cancelled due to weather. In their series against the San Diego Padres, the Phillies dropped the first two games as well; during the second game, closer Brad Lidge blew his first save in a Phillies uniform, breaking his streak of 47 consecutive saves extending back to the 2007 regular season. The Phillies won the Sunday afternoon matinee against the Padres, 5–4, on a walk-off home run by Ibáñez after trailing the entire game.

The Phillies' offense benefited from rest due to the postponement of the final game of the Padres' series, as they defeated the Milwaukee Brewers in the opener of their mid-week series, 11–4. The next two games did not go as smoothly, as the Phillies were shut out through eight innings in the second game and nearly no-hit by Brewers starter Dave Bush in the third game. Phillies starter Cole Hamels was hit by a line drive in the fourth inning and exited the game; before departing, he had retired nine out of the ten batters he faced. Hitting the road for a series against the division-leading Florida Marlins, the Phillies were shut out through eight innings in the first game of the series, only to score seven runs in the top of the ninth against power-throwing closer Matt Lindstrom, winning the game, 7–3, thanks to Shane Victorino's first career regular season grand slam. The following night's game offered another come-from-behind win for the Phillies, as they trailed in the ninth again to win in extra innings, 6–4, and the 13–2 victory on April 26 capped the team's first series sweep. Hosting Washington for their second series against the Nationals, the Phillies fell behind in the seventh inning before a grand slam by Ibáñez capped their 13–11 victory; combined with Ryan Howard's game-tying grand slam in the fifth inning, this was only the fourth time in Phillies history that teammates hit grand slams in the same game. The Phillies split the remaining two games of the series with Washington, finishing with an April record of 11–9, their second consecutive winning April.

May

The Phillies opened May against the division-rival New York Mets, losing the opening game of the month, 7–4. Back-to-back walks in the tenth inning of the Saturday afternoon game gave the Phillies their first win of the season over the Mets. After a rainout, the Phillies opened their first series in St. Louis with the Cardinals. They won the first game of the series on Howard's second grand slam in as many weeks after a pitchers' duel between starters Kyle Lohse and Joe Blanton and completed the two-game series sweep with a 10–7 victory on May 5, capped by a Jayson Werth three-run home run and a 4-for-5 performance from Victorino. The Phillies' brief stop in New York was marred by a two-game series sweep; Phillies hitters were shut down by Mets starters Johan Santana and Mike Pelfrey, and closer Francisco Rodríguez recorded saves in both games of the series. The following series was barely better, as the Phillies dropped two games to the Braves.

On May 12, Werth stole four bases, including home plate, tying a Phillies record and leading to a 5–3 win over the Los Angeles Dodgers; however, the series result was the same as the previous one, as the Phillies dropped two games in the set to Los Angeles.
Carrying a .500 winning percentage south from Philadelphia to Washington, the team visited the White House and was congratulated by President Barack Obama for their championship the previous season. The visit had been postponed from April 14 due to Kalas' death. After meeting the President, the Phillies opened the series with a second consecutive extra-inning game, defeating the Nationals in 12 innings. Because pitcher J. A. Happ had to enter Friday night's game in relief, the Phillies called up right-handed starting pitcher Andrew Carpenter from Reading to start the second game of Saturday's doubleheader (a make-up of the postponement from April 15). Carpenter earned his first major league win in the rain-shortened second game after Myers earned the win in the afternoon game. Though Sunday's starter Park only pitched 1 innings, the Phillies swept the series with the Nationals with an 8–6 come-from-behind win, with new call-up Sergio Escalona earning his first major league win. This marked the first time since the 2007 season that rookies had won back-to-back starts for the Phillies (Hamels and Kyle Kendrick). The Phillies took two of three games in each of their next two series with the Cincinnati Reds and the New York Yankees to finish their road trip with an 8–2 record. Though they lost two games against Florida, the final series of the month against Washington resulted in a second straight series sweep, as the Phillies defeated the Nationals in three consecutive games to finish the month with a 17–11 record; the last game of the series was Moyer's 250th career victory. With strong offensive performances in May, Howard and Ibáñez became the first pair of Phillies to hit 10 home runs in the same month.

June

The month of June saw the continuation of the Phillies' hot streak; from May 15 to June 4, the team compiled a 16–4 record, culminating with a three-game sweep of the Padres on the Phillies' first trip to the West Coast. In that series, rookie Antonio Bastardo made his major league debut, striking out five batters and allowing one earned run in six innings of work to earn his first career victory. Traveling north to Los Angeles for a rematch of the previous year's playoff series, the Phillies managed a split despite the bullpen's struggles. Lidge blew two saves in consecutive nights, taking the loss in the first game and allowing the game-tying home run in the other. The series was bookended by the team's first shutout of the season, a complete game by Hamels, and a second consecutive strong performance from Bastardo, who pitched five innings and allowed only two runs in a game that ended with a final score of 7–2. The final stop on the road trip was Citi Field, where the Phillies faced off against the Mets. All three games were close, with two one-run wins in the series and two extra-inning victories for the Phillies, won by home runs from Utley and Ibáñez on June 10 and 11.

The team's strong stretch did not continue, however, as the Phillies entered the second period of interleague play with five consecutive series against the American League East. While they managed a single win against the Boston Red Sox, it was followed by a six-game losing streak wherein the Phillies were swept by the Toronto Blue Jays and the Baltimore Orioles; Philadelphia was outscored 38–19 over the two series. The team showed promise in the first game of their World Series rematch series with the Tampa Bay Rays, winning 10–1, but were defeated in the last two games of the series and lost a fourth straight game to Toronto on June 26. However, the Phillies were able to exact a modicum of revenge for both their 1993 World Series defeat and the first series sweep by the Jays by winning the last two games. Happ played the role of stopper by pitching his first career complete-game shutout, and Moyer followed by earning his 252nd victory in the following game. To close the month, the Phillies lost the opener of their next series with the Braves to finish the month with a 10–16 record.

July

Struggles continued for the Phillies to open July, as the Braves completed a three-game series sweep in the first two days of the month; however, a face-off with the Mets over the Independence Day weekend revitalized the team's fortunes. The Phillies swept their northern rivals as the Mets managed only three runs in three games. During the series, the team's 2009 All-Stars were announced: Utley and Ibáñez were elected as starters, and Howard was named as a reserve, one of four first basemen selected to the National League squad. It was also announced that Victorino was one of the five "Final Vote" candidates. Though the Phillies had played much better on the road to this point in the season, home-field advantage paid off the next night, as the offense chased Reds starter Johnny Cueto after  of an inning by scoring nine runs; the team went on to score 10 in the first inning and 22 in the entire game. Every Phillies starter had at least one hit, Werth hit an eighth-inning grand slam off of Reds infielder Paul Janish, and Rollins and Victorino, at the top of the order, combined to go 7-for-9 with three doubles, a home run, nine runs scored, and five RBIs between them. Though closer Lidge suffered a tough loss on July 7, sacrificing a run in the ninth inning to earn his fourth of the season, the Phillies bounced back with a dramatic ninth-inning win the following night. Victorino hit a walk-off single to drive in Pedro Feliz and solidify his victory in the All-Star Final Vote, which was announced the next day. Werth was named to replace the New York Mets' Carlos Beltrán on the All-Star roster due to injury; Victorino replaced Beltrán as the starter in center field.

After the All-Star break—during which the American League defeated the National League, 4–3—Moyer, Ryan Madson, and J. C. Romero combined for a one-hit, complete-game shutout of the Marlins in the first game back, extending the Phillies' winning streak to six games, and their record to 10–3 in the month of July. The streak was extended to eight straight games as the Phillies swept Florida in three games of the series (one game was postponed due to weather). Happ raised his record to 7–0 on the season with another seven-inning shutout performance. The streak continued as the Phillies opened a series at home against the Chicago Cubs; Chad Durbin earned his first save in 11 months by pitching three scoreless innings of relief. Werth's three-run home run in the 13th inning the next night gave the Phillies a walk-off win for their tenth consecutive, but Chicago ended the season-high streak with a 10–5 defeat on July 22. The Phillies won three of their next four, and bolstered their rotation by trading for Cliff Lee. The 2008 American League Cy Young Award winner came from the Cleveland Indians along with outfielder Ben Francisco on July 29; the Phillies gave up four minor leaguers—catcher Lou Marson, infielders Jason Donald and pitchers Carlos Carrasco and Jason Knapp. Lee and Francisco joined the Phillies in San Francisco after the Phillies' series victory over the Arizona Diamondbacks, and both started the final game in July. Lee pitched a complete-game four-hitter on July 31, allowing one run over nine innings of work. The Phillies finished July with a 20–7 record, their first 20-win month since May 2001.

August

The Phillies opened the month of August with three straight losses, but the stopper's role again fell to the rookie Happ, who pitched his second shutout of the season—and the second of his career—against the Rockies on August 5. He earned the team's 60th win of the season while allowing four hits and striking out ten batters for the first time in his career. In accordance with his 8–2 record and strong performances, Amaro announced that Happ would remain in the Phillies' starting rotation despite the team's acquisitions of Lee and Pedro Martínez; rumors regarding Happ's status had been rampant since Martínez' signing and during the trade season when Happ was rumored to be the centerpiece of a potential trade for the Blue Jays' Roy Halladay. New pitcher Lee stifled the Rockies the following day to win the series for the Phillies with a second consecutive strong performance, allowing one run over seven innings and allowing only six hits. In the following series with Florida, however, the Phillies struggled. The Marlins swept all three games of the series, which included Victorino's first career ejection on several close calls by umpire Ed Rapuano, and a crucial error by Victorino's center field replacement, Werth, in the final game of the series. Moyer pitched against the Marlins in that game, a team against which he had prior success in his career (13–3, 2.87 ERA in 100 innings pitched), and allowed two earned runs on eleven singles through five innings; however, with a rotation-high 5.47 ERA, the Phillies demoted Moyer to the bullpen to allow Martínez to start. Francisco hit his second Phillies home run against the Cubs on August 11; it came in the 12th inning and scored the game-winning run for the Phillies. It became the first win of a three-game series sweep, which Lee closed out with a third straight dominant performance (eight innings pitched, one run allowed, eight strikeouts). The Phillies took two of three games from the Braves in their next series, and completed a three-game homestand against the Diamondbacks with a complete game from Lee, who carried a no-hitter into the sixth inning, and eight innings of three-run baseball from Blanton.

Martínez faced off against his former club on August 23, with the series tied 1–1. Mets starter Óliver Pérez allowed six runs in the first inning and was pulled in the middle of Martínez' first at-bat, down in the count 3–0. Ángel Pagán led off the Mets' first with an inside-the-park home run after the ball became lodged underneath the outfield wall. Martínez pitched six innings, allowing four runs, but the score was 9–6 by the end of the eighth inning. Lidge allowed another run to score and had runners on first and second, thanks in part to a booted base hit and an error by Eric Bruntlett. The Mets had no outs and Jeff Francoeur was at the plate representing the go-ahead run. Francoeur hit a line drive over the second base bag, where Bruntlett caught it, stepped on second base, and tagged Daniel Murphy coming from first, completing the 15th unassisted triple play in baseball's modern era and the second in Phillies history (Mickey Morandini) in a game called "the league's quirkiest of the season". The Phillies closed the series with a 6–2 win behind Lee's eighth straight victory (seven innings pitched, no earned runs). With a win on August 26, the Phillies claimed victory in the year's series over the Pirates; however, the Bucs won two games in a three-night set wherein the game-winning run was scored in the eighth inning or later each night. Andrew McCutchen hit a game-winning two-run home run off of Lidge in the ninth inning of the opener; Howard hit a game-winning three-run shot for the Phillies in the top of the tenth on August 26 after the Pirates tied it in the ninth on a Brandon Moss home run. Garrett Jones set a Pirates rookie record with his 15th home run off of Happ in the eighth inning of the series finale. The Phillies closed the month by taking two of three games from the Braves. For his 11 home run performance in August, Howard won the National League Player of the Month award.

September

The Phillies opened the month by taking two of a three-game series against the Giants, besting Jonathan Sánchez, who threw a no-hitter earlier in the 2009 season, and Tim Lincecum, who won the 2008 NL Cy Young Award. This was followed by a trip to Texas for a four-game series against the Houston Astros; the Phillies were unable to muster much offense during the series and were swept. On September 8, in the first game of the series against the Washington Nationals, Ibañez and Utley each hit their 30th home runs of the season, making them members of the 12th quartet of teammates in major league history to each reach 30 in a single season, joining Howard and Werth. The Phillies offense backed Lee to his sixth win the following night, with Madson earning his second consecutive save after assuming the de facto closer's role from Lidge. However, the Phillies could not overcome a pair of three-run home runs by Adam Dunn and Ian Desmond to secure the sweep in the last game of the series, despite Stairs' grand slam; it was their third loss of the season to Washington in fifteen games. The Mets came to Philadelphia for their last series of the season, which began on September 11. The Phillies won game one, 4–2, but the Mets came from behind in the second game of the series, scoring five runs in the final two innings to win 10–9. Making up a postponed game from earlier in the season, the Phillies won the first game of a day-night doubleheader behind Kyle Kendrick's first major league victory in 13 months. Eight shutout innings from Martínez in the nightcap gave the Phillies a 1–0 win, a 3–1 win in the 4-game set, and a 12–6 win in the season series. Martínez' eight innings also began a streak of 26 consecutive scoreless innings by Phillies pitchers: Madson followed with a scoreless ninth for his eighth save of the season; Cliff Lee pitched a complete-game shutout against the Nationals the following night; and Blanton, Park, and Madson combined for eight scoreless innings against Washington on September 16 until Tyler Walker allowed a run in the top of the ninth inning, an RBI single by Willie Harris which scored Justin Maxwell. Hamels closed out the series with a strong performance, perfect through his first five innings and finishing with one run allowed in eight; with their 15th win over the Nationals, the Phillies matched their best season record against the franchise, set against the 1976 Montréal Expos.

The Phillies continued to Atlanta, where they took two of three from the Braves, with Kendrick's second win and Lidge's 30th save in the first game of the series. Martínez was outdueled by Javier Vázquez in the second game of the series, but the Phillies avoided a loss by defeating the Braves, 4–2, on September 20. A doubleheader followed against the Marlins; the Phillies won game one, while the Marlins won game two. In the rubber game, Lidge blew his 11th save after a rain delay to give the Marlins a series victory, keeping the team's number to clinch the division at five. The Phillies and the Brewers split the next series at two games each, with Philadelphia winning the first and last game of the series. The Phillies returned to Citizens Bank Park for their final homestand to close out the season, opening with a fifth consecutive loss to the Astros. However, the Phillies broke the streak with a 7–4 win on September 29, thanks to a Feliz grand slam. The following night, the Phillies clinched their third consecutive division title with a 10–3 win over Houston, guaranteeing a split in the series and a playoff berth, and tying the franchise record for consecutive division titles set by Danny Ozark's teams from 1976 to 1978. After the clinching game, the Phillies rested most of their regular starters, six of whom had started over 150 games during the season; they lost four straight games while the regulars regained their strength, but won the final game of the season in extra innings as Paul Hoover hit a walk-off single in the bottom of the 10th inning. The Phillies finished with a record of 93–69, one game better than their record in the previous season.

Standings

Record vs. opponents

Game log

|- bgcolor="#ffbbbb"
| 1 || April 5 || Braves || 4–1 || Lowe (1–0) || Myers (0–1) || || 44,532 || 0–1
|- bgcolor="#ffbbbb"
| 2 || April 7 || Braves || 4–0 || Jurrjens (1–0) || Moyer (0–1) || || 44,178 || 0–2
|- bgcolor="#bbffbb"
| 3 || April 8 || Braves || 12–11 || Condrey (1–0) || Boyer (0–1) || Lidge (1) || 44,939 || 1–2
|- bgcolor="#ffbbbb"
| 4 || April 10 || @ Rockies || 10–3 || Marquis (1–0) || Hamels (0–1) || || 49,427 || 1–3
|- bgcolor="#bbffbb"
| 5 || April 11 || @ Rockies || 8–4 || Myers (1–1) || de la Rosa (0–1) || || 35,251 || 2–3
|- bgcolor="#bbffbb"
| 6 || April 12 || @ Rockies || 7–5 || Madson (1–0) || Street (0–1) || Lidge (2) || 21,628 || 3–3
|- bgcolor="#bbffbb"
| 7 || April 13 || @ Nationals || 9–8 || Moyer (1–1) || Rivera (0–1) || Lidge (3) || 40,386 || 4–3
|- bgcolor="#bbbbbb"
| — || April 15 || @ Nationals || colspan=6|Game postponed due to rain (May 16)
|- bgcolor="#ffbbbb"
| 8 || April 16 || @ Nationals || 8–2 || Martis (1–0) || Blanton (0–1) || || 20,494 || 4–4
|- bgcolor="#ffbbbb"
| 9 || April 17 || Padres || 8–7 || Meredith (2–0) || Madson (1–1) || || 44,984 || 4–5
|- bgcolor="#ffbbbb"
| 10 || April 18 || Padres || 8–5 || Meredith (3–0) || Lidge (0–1) || || 45,007 || 4–6
|- bgcolor="#bbffbb"
| 11 || April 19 || Padres || 5–4 || Condrey (2–0) || Moreno (0–1) || || 45,266 || 5–6
|- bgcolor="#bbbbbb"
| — || April 20 || Padres || colspan=6|Game postponed due to rain (July 23)
|- bgcolor="#bbffbb"
| 12 || April 21 || Brewers || 11–4 || Moyer (2–1) || Parra (0–3) || || 40,605 || 6–6
|- bgcolor="#ffbbbb"
| 13 || April 22 || Brewers || 3–1 || Looper (2–0) || Blanton (0–2) || || 32,759 || 6–7
|- bgcolor="#ffbbbb"
| 14 || April 23 || Brewers || 6–1 || Bush (1–0) || Hamels (0–2) || || 36,395 || 6–8
|- bgcolor="#bbffbb"
| 15 || April 24 || @ Marlins || 7–3 || Condrey (3–0) || Lindstrom (0–1) || || 29,032 || 7–8
|- bgcolor="#bbffbb"
| 16 || April 25 || @ Marlins || 6–4  || Madson (2–1) || Kensing (0–1) || Lidge (4) || 26,412 || 8–8
|- bgcolor="#bbffbb"
| 17 || April 26 || @ Marlins || 13–2 || Moyer (3–1) || Taylor (0–1) || || 17,177 || 9–8
|- bgcolor="#bbffbb"
| 18 || April 27 || Nationals || 13–11 || Happ (1–0) || Hanrahan (0–1) || Madson (1) || 41,620 || 10–8
|- bgcolor="#bbffbb"
| 19 || April 28 || Nationals || 7–1 || Durbin (1–0) || Lannan (0–3) || || 43,930 || 11–8
|- bgcolor="#ffbbbb"
| 20 || April 29 || Nationals || 4–1 || Olsen (1–3) || Myers (1–2) || || 36,351 || 11–9

|- bgcolor="#ffbbbb"
| 21 || May 1 || Mets || 7–4 || Pelfrey (3–0) || Park (0–1) || || 44,773 || 11–10
|- bgcolor="#bbffbb"
| 22 || May 2 || Mets || 6–5  || Taschner (1–0) || Green (0–2) || || 45,069 || 12–10
|- bgcolor="#bbbbbb"
| — || May 3 || Mets || colspan=6|Game postponed due to rain (September 13)
|- bgcolor="#bbffbb"
| 23 || May 4 || @ Cardinals || 6–1 || Blanton (1–2) || Lohse (3–1) || || 35,990 || 13–10
|- bgcolor="#bbffbb"
| 24 || May 5 || @ Cardinals || 10–7 || Myers (2–2) || Wainwright (3–1) || || 36,754 || 14–10
|- bgcolor="#ffbbbb"
| 25 || May 6 || @ Mets || 1–0 || Santana (4–1) || Eyre (0–1)|| Rodríguez (8) || 37,600 || 14–11
|- bgcolor="#ffbbbb"
| 26 || May 7 || @ Mets || 7–5 || Pelfrey (4–0) || Moyer (3–2) || Rodríguez (9) || 37,295 || 14–12
|- bgcolor="#bbffbb"
| 27 || May 8 || Braves || 10–6 || Hamels (1–2) || Reyes (0–2) || || 45,312 || 15–12
|- bgcolor="#ffbbbb"
| 28 || May 9 || Braves || 6–2 || Vázquez (3–3) || Blanton (1–3) || || 45,339 || 15–13
|- bgcolor="#ffbbbb"
| 29 || May 10 || Braves || 4–2 || Kawakami (2–4) || Taschner (1–1) || Soriano (3) || 45,343 || 15–14
|- bgcolor="#bbffbb"
| 30 || May 12 || Dodgers || 5–3 || Park (1–1) || Kershaw (1–3) || Lidge (5) || 45,191 || 16–14
|- bgcolor="#ffbbbb"
| 31 || May 13 || Dodgers || 9–2 || Wolf (2–1) || Moyer (3–3) || || 45,273 || 16–15
|- bgcolor="#ffbbbb"
| 32 || May 14 || Dodgers || 5–3  || Broxton (4–0) || Durbin (1–1) || || 45,307  || 16–16
|- bgcolor="#bbffbb"
| 33 || May 15 || @ Nationals || 10–6  || Happ (2–0) || Wells (0–1) || || 23,430 || 17–16
|- bgcolor="#bbffbb"
| 34 || May 16  || @ Nationals || 8–5 || Myers (3–2) || Olsen (1–4) || Lidge (6) || 19,910 || 18–16
|- bgcolor="#bbffbb"
| 35 || May 16  || @ Nationals || 7–5  || Carpenter (1–0) || Cabrera (0–5) || Condrey (1) || 23,896 || 19–16
|- bgcolor="#bbffbb"
| 36 || May 17 || @ Nationals || 8–6 || Escalona (1–0) || Tavárez (0–3) || Lidge (7) || 29,577 || 20–16
|- bgcolor="#bbffbb"
| 37 || May 19 || @ Reds || 4–3 || Hamels (2–2) || Cueto (4–2) || Lidge (8) || 18,449 || 21–16
|- bgcolor="#ffbbbb"
| 38 || May 20 || @ Reds || 5–1 || Harang (4–4) || Moyer (3–4) || || 15,661 || 21–17
|- bgcolor="#bbffbb"
| 39 || May 21 || @ Reds || 12–5 || Blanton (2–3) || Owings (3–5) || || 25,901 || 22–17
|- bgcolor="#bbffbb"
| 40 || May 22 || @ Yankees || 7–3 || Myers (4–2) || Burnett (2–2) || || 46,288 || 23–17
|- bgcolor="#ffbbbb"
| 41 || May 23 || @ Yankees || 5–4 || Veras (3–1) || Lidge (0–2) || || 46,889 || 23–18
|- bgcolor="#bbffbb"
| 42 || May 24 || @ Yankees || 4–3  || Condrey (4–0) || Tomko (0–1) || || 46,986 || 24–18
|- bgcolor="#ffbbbb"
| 43 || May 25 || Marlins || 5–3 || Volstad (4–3) || Moyer (3–5) || Lindstrom (9) || 45,186 || 24–19
|- bgcolor="#bbffbb"
| 44 || May 26 || Marlins || 5–3 || Blanton (3–3) || Miller (1–2) || Lidge (9) || 42,249 || 25–19
|- bgcolor="#ffbbbb"
| 45 || May 27 || Marlins || 6–2 || Badenhop (3–2) || Myers (4–3) || || 45,256 || 25–20
|- bgcolor="#bbffbb"
| 46 || May 29 || Nationals || 5–4 || Happ (3–0) || Detwiler (0–1) || Lidge (10) || 45,202 || 26–20
|- bgcolor="#bbffbb"
| 47 || May 30 || Nationals || 9–6 || Hamels (3–2) || Martis (7–1) || Lidge (11) || 45,121 || 27–20
|- bgcolor="#bbffbb"
| 48 || May 31 || Nationals || 4–2 || Moyer (4–5) || Lannan (2–5) || Lidge (12)|| 45,239 || 28–20

|- bgcolor="#bbffbb"
| 49 || June 1 || @ Padres || 5–3 || Blanton (4–3) || Correia (1–4) || Lidge (13) || 22,825 || 29–20
|- bgcolor="#bbffbb"
| 50 || June 2 || @ Padres || 10–5 || Bastardo (1–0) || Peavy (5–6) || Madson (2) || 17,625 || 30–20
|- bgcolor="#bbffbb"
| 51 || June 3 || @ Padres || 5–1 || Happ (4–0) || Young (4–4) || || 15,436 || 31–20
|- bgcolor="#bbffbb"
| 52 || June 4 || @ Dodgers || 3–0 || Hamels (4–2) || Kershaw (3–4) || || 33,839 || 32–20
|- bgcolor="#ffbbbb"
| 53 || June 5 || @ Dodgers || 4–3 || Broxton (6–0) || Lidge (0–3) || || 52,538 || 32–21
|- bgcolor="#ffbbbb"
| 54 || June 6 || @ Dodgers || 3–2 || Wade (1–3) || Durbin (1–2) || || 41,412 || 32–22
|- bgcolor="#bbffbb"
| 55 || June 7 || @ Dodgers || 7–2 || Bastardo (2–0) || Wolf (3–2) || || 42,288 || 33–22
|- bgcolor="#ffbbbb"
| 56 || June 9 || @ Mets || 6–5 || Santana (8–3) || Condrey (4–1) || Rodríguez (16) || 37,152 || 33–23
|- bgcolor="#bbffbb"
| 57 || June 10 || @ Mets || 5–4  || Park (2–1) || Parnell (2–1) || Madson (3) || 38,723 || 34–23
|- bgcolor="#bbffbb"
| 58 || June 11 || @ Mets || 6–3 || Eyre (1–1) || Parnell (2–2) || Madson (4) || 38,532 || 35–23
|- bgcolor="#ffbbbb"
| 59 || June 12 || Red Sox || 5–2 || Saito (2–0) || Kendrick (0–1) || Bard (1) || 45,321 || 35–24
|- bgcolor="#ffbbbb"
| 60 || June 13 || Red Sox || 11–6 || Okajima (3–0) || Bastardo (2–1) || || 45,202 || 35–25
|- bgcolor="#bbffbb"
| 61 || June 14 || Red Sox || 11–6 || Park (3–1) || Beckett (7–3) || || 45,141 || 36–25
|- bgcolor="#ffbbbb"
| 62 || June 16 || Blue Jays || 8–3  || Downs (1–0) || Condrey (4–2) || || 44,958 || 36–26
|- bgcolor="#ffbbbb"
| 63 || June 17 || Blue Jays || 7–1 || Richmond (5–3) || Moyer (4–6) || || 42,091 || 36–27
|- bgcolor="#ffbbbb"
| 64 || June 18 || Blue Jays || 8–7 || Frasor (5–0) || Madson (2–2) || Accardo (1) || 44,036 || 36–28
|- bgcolor="#ffbbbb"
| 65 || June 19 || Orioles || 7–2 || Hill (3–1) || Bastardo (2–2) || || 45,135 || 36–29
|- bgcolor="#ffbbbb"
| 66 || June 20 || Orioles || 6–5 || Hendrickson (2–4) || Madson (2–3) || Sherrill (14) || 44,939 || 36–30
|- bgcolor="#ffbbbb"
| 67 || June 21 || Orioles || 2–1 || Guthrie (5–7) || Hamels (4–3) || Sherrill (15) || 45,256 || 36–31
|- bgcolor="#bbffbb"
| 68 || June 23 || @ Rays || 10–1 || Moyer (5–6) || Price (1–2) || || 19,608 || 37–31
|- bgcolor="#ffbbbb"
| 69 || June 24 || @ Rays || 7–1 || Garza (5–5) || Blanton (4–4) || || 18,862 || 37–32
|- bgcolor="#ffbbbb"
| 70 || June 25 || @ Rays || 10–4 || Sonnanstine (6–7) || Bastardo (2–3) || || 20,141 || 37–33
|- bgcolor="#ffbbbb"
| 71 || June 26 || @ Blue Jays || 6–1 || R. Romero (5–3) || Hamels (4–4) || || 21,331 || 37–34
|- bgcolor="#bbffbb"
| 72 || June 27 || @ Blue Jays || 10–0 || Happ (5–0) || Mills (0–1) || || 28,801 || 38–34
|- bgcolor="#bbffbb"
| 73 || June 28 || @ Blue Jays || 5–4 || Moyer (6–6) || Tallet (5–5) || Lidge (14) || 36,379 || 39–34
|- bgcolor="#ffbbbb"
| 74 || June 30 || @ Braves || 5–4  || Moylan (2–2) || Park (3–2) || || 31,818 || 39–35

|- bgcolor="#ffbbbb"
| 75 || July 1 || @ Braves || 11–1 || Jurrjens (6–6) || Hamels (4–5) || || 25,212 || 39–36
|- bgcolor="#ffbbbb"
| 76 || July 2 || @ Braves || 5–2 || González (3–0) || Madson (2–4) || Soriano (7) || 38,254 || 39–37
|- bgcolor="#bbffbb"
| 77 || July 3 || Mets || 7–2 || López (1–0) || Hernández (5–4) || || 45,231 || 40–37
|- bgcolor="#bbffbb"
| 78 || July 4 || Mets || 4–1 || Moyer (7–6) || Nieve (3–2) || Lidge (15) || 45,141 || 41–37
|- bgcolor="#bbffbb"
| 79 || July 5 || Mets || 2–0 || Blanton (5–4) || Santana (9–7) || Lidge (16) || 45,333 || 42–37
|- bgcolor="#bbffbb"
| 80 || July 6 || Reds || 22–1 || Hamels (5–5) || Cueto (8–5) || || 41,548 || 43–37
|- bgcolor="#ffbbbb"
| 81 || July 7 || Reds || 4–3 || Weathers (1–1) || Lidge (4) || Cordero (21) || 43,623 || 43–38
|- bgcolor="#bbffbb"
| 82 || July 8 || Reds || 3–2 || Madson (3–4) || Weathers (1–2) || || 44,179 || 44–38
|- bgcolor="#bbffbb"
| 83 || July 9 || Reds || 9–6 || Moyer (8–6) || Owings (6–9) || Lidge (17) || 45,146 || 45–38
|- bgcolor="#bbffbb"
| 84 || July 10 || Pirates || 3–2 || Blanton (6–4) || Duke (8–8) || Lidge (18) || 45,246 || 46–38
|- bgcolor="#bbffbb"
| 85 || July 11 || Pirates || 8–7 || Walker (1–0) || Capps (1–5) || || 45,209 || 47–38
|- bgcolor="#bbffbb"
| 86 || July 12 || Pirates || 5–2 || Happ (6–0) || Vasquez (1–3) || || 45,245 || 48–38
|-
|colspan=9 bgcolor="#bbcaff"|All-Star Break: AL defeats NL, 4–3
|- bgcolor="#bbffbb"
| 87 || July 16 || @ Marlins || 4–0 || Moyer (9–6) || Volstad (6–9) || || 15,171 || 49–38
|- bgcolor="#bbffbb"
| 88 || July 17 || @ Marlins || 6–5  || Condrey (5–2) || Badenhop (5–4) || Lidge (19) || 22,891 || 50–38
|- bgcolor="#bbbbbb"
| — || July 18 || @ Marlins || colspan=6|Game postponed due to rain (September 22)
|- bgcolor="#bbffbb"
| 89 || July 19 || @ Marlins || 5–0 || Happ (7–0) || Miller (3–5) || || 15,033 || 51–38
|- bgcolor="#bbffbb"
| 90 || July 20 || Cubs || 10–1 || López (2–0) || Lilly (9–7) || Durbin (1) || 45,268 || 52–38
|- bgcolor="#bbffbb"
| 91 || July 21 || Cubs || 4–1  || Condrey (6–2) || Samardzija (0–1) || || 45,214 || 53–38
|- bgcolor="#ffbbbb"
| 92 || July 22 || Cubs || 10–5 || Zambrano (7–4) || Moyer (9–7) || Gregg (19) || 45,257 || 53–39
|- bgcolor="#bbffbb"
| 93 || July 23 || Padres || 9–4 || Hamels (6–5) || Correia (6–8) || || 45,242 || 54–39
|- bgcolor="#ffbbbb"
| 94 || July 24 || Cardinals || 8–1 || Piñeiro (9–9) || Happ (7–1) || || 45,166 || 54–40
|- bgcolor="#bbffbb"
| 95 || July 25 || Cardinals || 14–6 || López (3–0) || Motte (3–4) || || 45,182 || 55–40
|- bgcolor="#bbffbb"
| 96 || July 26 || Cardinals || 9–2 || Blanton (7–4) || Wellemeyer (7–9) || || 45,271 || 56–40
|- bgcolor="#bbffbb"
| 97 || July 27 || @ Diamondbacks || 6–2 || Moyer (10–7) || Garland (5–10) || || 20,565 || 57–40
|- bgcolor="#bbffbb"
| 98 || July 28 || @ Diamondbacks || 4–3 || Hamels (7–5) || Haren (10–6) || Lidge (20) || 25,044 || 58–40
|- bgcolor="#ffbbbb"
| 99 || July 29 || @ Diamondbacks || 4–0 || Petit (1–5) || Happ (7–2) || || 22,952 || 58–41
|- bgcolor="#ffbbbb"
| 100 || July 30 || @ Giants || 7–2 || Sánchez (4–9) || López (3–1) || || 36,603 || 58–42
|- bgcolor="#bbffbb"
| 101 || July 31 || @ Giants || 4–1 || Lee (1–0) || Sadowski (2–4) || || 33,934 || 59–42

|- bgcolor="#ffbbbb"
| 102 || August 1 || @ Giants || 2–0 || Lincecum (12–3) || Blanton (7–5) || Wilson (27) || 42,964 || 59–43
|- bgcolor="#ffbbbb"
| 103 || August 2 || @ Giants || 7–3 || Zito (7–10) || Hamels (7–6) || || 42,744 || 59–44
|- bgcolor="#ffbbbb"
| 104 || August 4 || Rockies || 8–3 || Hammel (6–6) || Moyer (10–8) || || 45,203 || 59–45
|- bgcolor="#bbffbb"
| 105 || August 5 || Rockies || 7–0 || Happ (8–2) || de la Rosa (9–8) || || 45,129 || 60–45
|- bgcolor="#bbffbb"
| 106 || August 6 || Rockies || 3–1 || Lee (2–0) || Cook (10–4) || Lidge (21) || 45,316 || 61–45
|- bgcolor="#ffbbbb"
| 107 || August 7 || Marlins || 3–2 || Nolasco (8–7) || Blanton (7–6) || Núñez (10) || 45,114 || 61–46
|- bgcolor="#ffbbbb"
| 108 || August 8 || Marlins || 6–4 || Sanches (2–1) || Hamels (7–7) || Núñez (11) || 45,086 || 61–47
|- bgcolor="#ffbbbb"
| 109 || August 9 || Marlins || 12–3 || Johnson (11–2) || Moyer (10–9) || || 45,169 || 61–48
|- bgcolor="#bbffbb"
| 110 || August 11 || @ Cubs || 4–3  || Eyre (2–1) || Gregg (4–4) || Durbin (2) || 41,477 || 62–48
|- bgcolor="#bbffbb"
| 111 || August 12 || @ Cubs || 12–5 || Martínez (1–0) || Samardzija (1–2) || || 41,133 || 63–48
|- bgcolor="#bbffbb"
| 112 || August 13 || @ Cubs || 6–1 || Lee (3–0) || Dempster (6–6) || || 41,100 || 64–48
|- bgcolor="#bbffbb"
| 113 || August 14 || @ Braves || 3–2 || Madson (4–4) || Soriano (1–4) || Lidge (22) || 37,639 || 65–48
|- bgcolor="#ffbbbb"
| 114 || August 15 || @ Braves || 4–3 || Moylan (5–2) || Lidge (0–5) || || 44,043 || 65–49
|- bgcolor="#bbffbb"
| 115 || August 16 || @ Braves || 4–1 || Happ (9–2) || Vázquez (10–8) || Lidge (23) || 25,215 || 66–49
|- bgcolor="#bbffbb"
| 116 || August 18 || Diamondbacks || 5–1 || Moyer (11–9) || Garland (6–11) || || 45,186 || 67–49
|- bgcolor="#bbffbb"
| 117 || August 19 || Diamondbacks || 8–1 || Lee (4–0) || Haren (12–8) || || 45,356 || 68–49
|- bgcolor="#bbffbb"
| 118 || August 20 || Diamondbacks || 12–3 || Blanton (8–6) || Davis (7–11) || || 45,172 || 69–49
|- bgcolor="#ffbbbb"
| 119 || August 21 || @ Mets || 2–4 || Pelfrey (9–8) || Hamels (7–8) || Rodríguez (27) || 38,243 || 69–50
|- bgcolor="#bbffbb"
| 120 || August 22 || @ Mets || 4–1 || Happ (10–2) || Misch (0–1) || Lidge (24) || 38,049 || 70–50
|- bgcolor="#bbffbb"
| 121 || August 23 || @ Mets || 9–7 || Martínez (2–0) || Pérez (3–4) || Lidge (25) || 39,038 || 71–50
|- bgcolor="#bbffbb"
| 122 || August 24 || @ Mets || 6–2 || Lee (5–0) || Parnell (3–6) || || 39,336 || 72–50
|- bgcolor="#ffbbbb"
| 123 || August 25 || @ Pirates || 6–4 || Capps (3–7) || Lidge (0–6) || || 17,049 || 72–51
|- bgcolor="#bbffbb"
| 124 || August 26 || @ Pirates || 4–1  || Madson (5–4) || Jackson (2–3) || || 17,403 || 73–51
|- bgcolor="#ffbbbb"
| 125 || August 27 || @ Pirates || 3–2 || Bautista (1–0) || Happ (10–3) || Capps (24) || 24,470 || 73–52
|- bgcolor="#bbffbb"
| 126 || August 28 || Braves || 4–2 || Moyer (12–9) || Hanson (9–3) || Lidge (26) || 44,747 || 74–52
|- bgcolor="#ffbbbb"
| 127 || August 29 || Braves || 9–1  || Lowe (13–8) || Lee (5–1) || || 45,134 || 74–53
|- bgcolor="#bbffbb"
| 128 || August 30 || Braves || 3–2 || Blanton (9–6) || Jurrjens (10–9) || Lidge (27) || 44,828 || 75–53

|- bgcolor="#bbffbb"
| 129 || September 1 || Giants || 1–0 || Hamels (8–8) || Sánchez (6–11) || || 44,679 || 76–53
|- bgcolor="#ffbbbb"
| 130 || September 2 || Giants || 4–0 || Penny (1–0) || Happ (10–4) || || 45,086 || 76–54
|- bgcolor="#bbffbb"
| 131 || September 3 || Giants || 2–1 || Martínez (3–0) || Lincecum (13–5) || Lidge (28) || 45,156 || 77–54
|- bgcolor="#ffbbbb"
| 132 || September 4 || @ Astros || 7–0 || Rodríguez (13–9) || Lee (5–2) || || 30,043 || 77–55
|- bgcolor="#ffbbbb"
| 133 || September 5 || @ Astros || 5–4 ||  Valverde (3–2) || Lidge (0–7) || || 35,195 || 77–56
|- bgcolor="#ffbbbb"
| 134 || September 6 || @ Astros || 4–3 || Norris (4–3) || Hamels (8–9) ||  Valverde (21) || 34,754 || 77–57
|- bgcolor="#ffbbbb"
| 135 || September 7 || @ Astros || 4–3 || Wright (3–2) || Park (3–3) ||  Valverde (22) || 29,040 || 77–58
|- bgcolor="#bbffbb"
| 136 || September 8 || @ Nationals || 5–3 || Martínez (4–0) || Lannan (8–11) || Madson (5) || 17,153 || 78–58
|- bgcolor="#bbffbb"
| 137 || September 9 || @ Nationals || 6–5 || Lee (6–2) || Clippard (2–2) || Madson (6) || 16,818 || 79–58
|- bgcolor="#ffbbbb"
| 138 || September 10 || @ Nationals || 8–7 || Hernández (8–10) || Blanton (9–7) || Villone (1) || 18,706 || 79–59
|- bgcolor="#bbffbb"
| 139 || September 11 || Mets || 4–2 || Hamels (9–9) || Figueroa (2–5) || Madson (7) || 44,377 || 80–59
|- bgcolor="#ffbbbb"
| 140 || September 12 || Mets || 10–9 || Feliciano (6–4) || Madson (5–5) || Rodríguez (31) || 45,243 || 80–60
|- bgcolor="#bbffbb"
| 141 || September 13  || Mets || 5–4 || Kendrick (1–1) || Maine (5–5) || Lidge (29) || 45,024 || 81–60
|- bgcolor="#bbffbb"
| 142 || September 13  || Mets || 1–0 || Martínez (5–0) || Redding (2–6) || Madson (8) || 44,901 || 82–60
|- bgcolor="#bbffbb"
| 143 || September 15 || Nationals || 5–0 || Lee (7–2) || Mock (3–8) || || 44,521 || 83–60
|- bgcolor="#bbffbb"
| 144 || September 16 || Nationals || 6–1 || Blanton (10–7) || Hernández (8–11) || || 44,223 || 84–60
|- bgcolor="#bbffbb"
| 145 || September 17 || Nationals || 4–2 || Hamels (10–9) || Detwiler (0–6) || Lidge (30) || 45,210 || 85–60
|- bgcolor="#bbffbb"
| 146 || September 18 || @ Braves || 9–4 || Kendrick (2–1) || Hudson (1–1) || || 27,241 || 86–60
|- bgcolor="#ffbbbb"
| 147 || September 19 || @ Braves || 6–4 || Vázquez (14–9) || Martínez (5–1) || || 35,818 || 86–61
|- bgcolor="#bbffbb"
| 148 || September 20 || @ Braves || 4–2 || Walker (2–0) || Hanson (10–4) || Lidge (31) || 29,452 || 87–61
|- bgcolor="#bbffbb"
| 149 || September 22  || @ Marlins || 9–3 || Blanton (11–7) || Johnson (15–5) || || — || 88–61
|- bgcolor="#ffbbbb"
| 150 || September 22  || @ Marlins || 3–0 || Sánchez (3–7) || Moyer (12–10) || Núñez (24) || 20,039 || 88–62
|- bgcolor="#ffbbbb"
| 151 || September 23 || @ Marlins || 7–6 || Meyer (3–1) || Lidge (0–8) || || 31,042 || 88–63
|- bgcolor="#bbffbb"
| 152 || September 24 || @ Brewers || 9–4 || Happ (11–4) || Suppan (7–11) || || 37,678 || 89–63
|- bgcolor="#ffbbbb"
| 153 || September 25 || @ Brewers || 8–4 || Parra (11–10) || Lee (7–3) || Hoffman (36) || 33,428 || 89–64
|- bgcolor="#ffbbbb"
| 154 || September 26 || @ Brewers || 7–5 || Hoffman (2–2) || Walker (2–1) || || 40,141 || 89–65
|- bgcolor="#bbffbb"
| 155 || September 27 || @ Brewers || 6–5 || Blanton (12–7) || Bush (5–9) || Madson (9) || 37,197 || 90–65
|- bgcolor="#ffbbbb"
| 156 || September 28 || Astros || 8–2 || Bazardo (1–2) || Hamels (10–10) || || 45,146 || 90–66
|- bgcolor="#bbffbb"
| 157 || September 29 || Astros || 7–4 || Happ (12–4) || López (0–1) || Madson (10) || 45,082 || 91–66
|- bgcolor="#bbffbb"
| 158 || September 30 || Astros || 10–3 || Kendrick (3–1) || Moehler (8–12) || || 45,207 || 92–66

|- bgcolor="#ffbbbb"
| 159 || October 1 || Astros || 5–3 || Paulino (3–11) || Lee (7–4) || || 44,905 || 92–67
|- bgcolor="#ffbbbb"
| 160 || October 2 || Marlins || 7–2 || VandenHurk (3–2) || Blanton (12–8) || || 45,135 || 92–68
|- bgcolor="#ffbbbb"
| 161 || October 3 || Marlins || 4–3 || Sánchez (4–8) || Hamels (10–11) || Núñez (26) || 45,141 || 92–69
|- bgcolor="#bbffbb"
| 162 || October 4 || Marlins || 7–6  || Durbin (2–2) || Meyer (3–2) || || 45,211 || 93–69

|-
|

Postseason Game Log

|- style="background:#bfb;"
| 1 || October 7 || Rockies || 5–1 || || || || || 1–0
|- style="background:#fbb;"
| 2 || October 8 || Rockies || 4–5 || || || || || 1–1
|- style="background:#bfb;"
| 3 || October 11 || @ Rockies || 6–5 || || || || || 2–1
|- style="background:#bfb;"
| 4 || October 12 || @ Rockies || 5–4 || || || || || 3–1
|-

|- style="background:#bfb;"
| 1 || October 15 || @ Dodgers || 8–6 || || || || || 1–0
|- style="background:#fbb;"
| 2 || October 16 || @ Dodgers || 1–2 || || || || || 1–1
|- style="background:#bfb;"
| 3 || October 18 || Dodgers || 11–0 || || || || || 2–1
|- style="background:#bfb;"
| 4 || October 19 || Dodgers || 5–4 || || || || || 3–1
|- style="background:#bfb;"
| 5 || October 21 || Dodgers || 10–4 || || || || || 4–1
|-

|- style="background:#bfb;"
| 1 || October 28 || @ Yankees || 6–1 || || || || || 1–0
|- style="background:#fbb;"
| 2 || October 29 || @ Yankees || 1–3 || || || || || 1–1
|- style="background:#fbb;"
| 3 || October 31 || Yankees || 5–8 || || || || || 1–2
|- style="background:#fbb;"
| 4 || November 1 || Yankees || 4–7 || || || || || 1–3
|- style="background:#bfb;"
| 5 || November 2 || Yankees || 8–6 || || || || || 2–3
|- style="background:#fbb;"
| 6 || November 4 || @ Yankees || 3–7 || || || || || 2–4
|-

Roster
All players who made an appearance for the Phillies during 2009 are included.

Postseason

National League Division Series

The Phillies, as the No. 2 seed in the National League, faced off against the wild card Colorado Rockies in the first round of the playoffs. Cliff Lee pitched a complete game in the opener of the series, shutting out the Rockies through  innings before allowing a single run in the ninth. He threw 113 pitches in the game, in addition to getting a hit and a stolen base in his first postseason start. The Rockies evened the series in the second game, as Cole Hamels left the stadium early to be with his wife, who went into labor with their first child. The Phillies staged comebacks twice to bring them within a run of tying the game, but could not close the door as Huston Street saved the game for Aaron Cook.

After Charlie Manuel named Pedro Martínez his Game 3 starter, the game was postponed a day due to the weather forecast of snow and record-low temperatures. The postponement prompted Manuel to change his plans, naming rookie left-hander J. A. Happ the new starter for the game. Happ pitched three innings, allowing three runs, but Manuel brought Joe Blanton out of the bullpen, who pitched  innings and allowed only one run. Brad Lidge, after 11 blown saves during the regular season, preserved the win for the Phillies, a 6–5 victory. In a back-and-forth affair, the Phillies and Rockies traded leads through Game 4 at Coors Field, but the Phillies scored three runs in the top of the ninth to win by one run. Combined with the sweeps in the other three Division Series, 2009 became the first year since the implementation of the wild card in 1995 that all four Championship Series berths were clinched on the road.

Game 1

Game 2

Game 3

Game 4

National League Championship Series

The Los Angeles Dodgers were the National League's No. 1 seed by virtue of the best record entering the playoffs; thus, the Phillies traveled to Chavez Ravine for the opener of the playoffs' second round, the fifth postseason meeting between the two clubs. James Loney opened the scoring for the Dodgers with a solo home run in the bottom of the second inning, but the Phillies answered back with a five-run fifth inning, chasing starter Clayton Kershaw. Manny Ramírez' two-run home run in the bottom of the inning made the score 5–4, but Raúl Ibañez followed with a three-run home run in the top of the eighth. Lidge, appearing in his third consecutive postseason game, notched his third consecutive save. Martínez started the second game for the Phillies, throwing 7 scoreless innings on 87 pitches. After his departure, the Phillies used five bullpen pitchers to get three outs in the eighth inning; those pitchers allowed three hits and two walks, allowing two runs to score. Jonathan Broxton saved the second game for the Dodgers, as Los Angeles won, 2–1.

The series moved to Philadelphia for the third game, and the Phillies capitalized on their home crowd immediately, scoring four runs in the first inning of the game. Lee continued his "superb" postseason performance with an eight-inning shutout performance, allowing three singles and a stolen base. Lee and his batterymate Ruiz had higher offensive production in Game 3 (three hits in six at-bats, three runs scored, one run batted in) than the entire Dodger lineup (three hits in twenty-seven at bats, no runs scored). The Phillies won the game, 11–0. In Game 4, Howard continued to slug, hitting a two-run home run off of former-Phillie Randy Wolf in the first inning; with the run batted in, he tied Lou Gehrig's Major League record of eight consecutive postseason games with an RBI. The Dodgers came back to score two runs on a defensive miscue in the fourth inning, adding one run in the fifth on a Matt Kemp home run and one in the sixth on a Casey Blake single. The Phillies got one back in the bottom of the sixth on a Victorino triple and a single by Utley, but were held scoreless until the bottom of the ninth. Los Angeles closer Broxton entered the game in the bottom of the eighth—after George Sherrill allowed two runners to reach base—and coaxed Werth to fly out. Broxton returned to the mound in the bottom of the ninth, inducing a ground ball from Ibáñez before walking Matt Stairs and hitting Ruiz. Greg Dobbs pinch-hit for the pitcher's spot, lining out to third base. With two outs and two runners aboard, Jimmy Rollins hit a  fastball to the right-center field gap, scoring Eric Bruntlett (who had pinch-run) and Ruiz. In the fifth game, the Phillies hit four home runs, including two by Jayson Werth, as Hamels allowed three runs in his second start of the series. The Phillies bullpen pitched  innings in the game, allowing only one run as Philadelphia defeated Los Angeles, 10–4. The win clinched the Phillies' first consecutive National League pennants in franchise history, and the first back-to-back World Series appearances by a National League franchise since the Atlanta Braves in 1995 and 1996. Howard was named the MVP of the National League Championship Series.

Game 1

Game 2

Game 3

Game 4

Game 5

World Series

The Phillies played the New York Yankees in a three-game series over the Memorial Day weekend during the regular season in May. Rollins said:
How great would that be? A World Series here, us against the Yankees?… We've proved we can put on a pretty good show.
The Yankees defeated the Phillies, four games to two, to win the franchise's record 27th World Series championship. The Yankees had home field advantage for the series, due to an American League victory in the 2009 All-Star Game. In addition to the 27th championship for New York, several records were tied, extended, or broken during the Series, including postseason wins (Andy Pettitte with 18), home runs in a World Series (Utley with 5), strikeouts by a batter in a World Series (Howard with 13), World Series saves (Mariano Rivera with 11), and RBI in a single World Series game (Hideki Matsui with 6).

Game 1

The two previous years' American League Cy Young Award winners started the game: CC Sabathia, for the Yankees; and Lee, for the Phillies. Sabathia, who had been 3–0 in the postseason to date, pitched seven innings and allowed two earned runs on four hits; Lee, however, pitched a complete game and allowed no earned runs to go the distance for the second time during the 2009 postseason. The Phillies offense was paced by Utley, who walked in the first inning to set a record of 26 consecutive postseason games reaching base, and hit solo home runs in the third and sixth innings. Philadelphia led 2–0 until the eighth inning, when an Ibáñez single scored Rollins and Victorino, and added two more runs in the top of the ninth inning on a Victorino single and a Howard double. The Phillies allowed an unearned run in the bottom of the ninth when Rollins committed a throwing error, tossing the ball past Howard at first base and into the Yankee dugout.

Game 2

The Phillies scored first for the second game in a row in the second inning; Raúl Ibañez hit a ground rule double, and a Matt Stairs single off of A. J. Burnett drove him in. It was the only run allowed by the New York pitching staff. Mark Teixeira tied the game with a solo home run in the fourth inning, and Hideki Matsui broke the tie in the sixth with another, giving the Yankees their first lead. Chan Ho Park allowed an RBI single to Jorge Posada after Martínez put two baserunners on in the top of the seventh. Burnett departed after seven innings, replaced by Mariano Rivera in the eighth. The Phillies put two runners on with a walk to Jimmy Rollins and a single by Shane Victorino with one out in the eighth. However, Chase Utley grounded into an inning-ending double play ending on a close play at first base that drew controversy. Rivera completed the ninth inning for his 38th postseason save.

Game 3

After an 80-minute rain delay, the Phillies scored first in the second inning with Jayson Werth's lead-off home run followed by a bases-loaded walk and a sacrifice fly. In the fourth inning, Alex Rodriguez hit a ball down the right field line, which struck a camera at the fence and was ruled a home run after review. Nick Swisher opened the top of the fifth inning with a double and scored on a single to center field by Andy Pettitte. Jeter followed with a single, and both he and Pettite were driven in by a Johnny Damon double. J. A. Happ replaced Hamels and  allowed a solo home run to Swisher in the sixth inning. Werth answered with a second home run of the game leading off the bottom of the sixth. Mariano Rivera recorded his 38th career postseason save to close out the Yankees' second consecutive win.

Game 4

The Yankees opened the scoring in the first inning with two runs, but the Phillies answered with back-to-back doubles by Shane Victorino and Chase Utley in the bottom of the inning. The Phillies tied the game in the bottom of the fourth as Ryan Howard singled, stole second, and scored on a single by Pedro Feliz. Replays showed that Howard did not touch home plate as he slid across; however, the Yankees did not appeal. Swisher led off the fifth inning with a walk, scoring on a single by Derek Jeter, and Melky Cabrera scored on a single by Damon. Park relieved Blanton in the seventh and held the Yankees scoreless. Chase Utley hit his third home run of the series in the bottom of the seventh with two outs. Dámaso Marte struck out Howard to end the inning. After a game-tying home run by Feliz, Lidge entered the game in the ninth and gave up a two-out single to Damon. With Teixeira batting, Damon stole second and advanced to third as the base was uncovered due to the pull shift against Teixeira. Rodriguez put the Yankees ahead with a double to left field, scoring Damon. Posada added to that lead with a single which scored Teixeira, who had singled, and Rodriguez. Mariano Rivera entered in the bottom of the ninth and notched his second save of the series.

Game 5

The Yankees scored first for the second straight game, but Utley gave the lead back to Philadelphia on a three-run home run. Werth and Ibáñez drove in Utley and Howard in the third inning, which chased the starter, Burnett. David Robertson allowed another run to score on a Carlos Ruiz groundout. Eric Hinske, who entered as a pinch-hitter, scored on a ground out by Johnny Damon. Utley tied Reggie Jackson's record for most home runs in a World Series with a solo home run in the seventh inning, his fifth of the series. Howard struck out for the 12th time in the series, tying Willie Wilson's 1980 record for most strikeouts in a World Series. Ibáñez hit a solo home run to chase pitcher Phil Coke. After being hit in the hand in the first inning, Victorino was replaced defensively in the eighth inning by Ben Francisco. Lee left the game after allowing two runs to score, and Park gave up a sacrifice fly to Robinson Canó to add another earned run to Lee's line. Ryan Madson entered in the ninth to close the game, allowing one run on a double play but earning his first career World Series save.

Game 6

The Yankees scored first when Matsui hit a two-run home run with Rodriguez on base after a walk. The Phillies responded with a triple by Ruiz, who scored on a sacrifice fly by Rollins in the top of the third inning. Matsui added to the Yankee lead with a bases-loaded single in the bottom of the inning, scoring Jeter and Damon. Martínez was relieved after four innings by Durbin, who allowed a ground rule double to Jeter, who later scored on a Teixeira single. Durbin hit Rodriguez and was relieved by Happ after recording one out. Happ allowed a two-run double to Matsui, his fifth and sixth RBI of the game which tied a World Series record for most RBI in a single game set by Bobby Richardson in the 1960 World Series.

In the sixth inning, Howard's home run following a walk issued to Utley brought the game to 7–3. After Ibáñez hit a double into right field, Joba Chamberlain relieved Pettitte, allowing no further runs in the inning. In the top of the eighth inning, Dámaso Marte struck out Howard, which set a new World Series record for most strikeouts by a batter in a single series (13). After the strikeout, Marte was relieved by Rivera in a non-save situation, who allowed one hit and one walk before closing out the game and the Yankees' 27th championship.

Awards

The 2009 Phillies captured the Warren C. Giles Trophy, as winners of the National League pennant. Baseball America named the Phillies as its Organization of the Year. The Philadelphia Sports Writers Association named the Phillies its "Team of the Year".

Individual awards were won by Rollins, who won a third straight Rawlings Gold Glove Award at shortstop, Victorino, who won a second Gold Glove in the outfield; Utley, who won his fourth consecutive Silver Slugger Award at second base; Werth, who was named the "This Year in Baseball Awards" Unsung Player of the Year, and Howard, who was named the Most Valuable Player of the National League Championship Series. Happ was named the Players Choice Awards NL Outstanding Rookie by his fellow players and the "This Year in Baseball Awards" Rookie of the Year. He also received the Sporting News NL Rookie of the Year Award and was named to the Baseball America All-Rookie Team (as one of five pitchers) and the Topps All-Star Rookie team (as the left-handed pitcher).

The Philadelphia chapter of the Baseball Writers' Association of America (BBWAA) presented its annual franchise awards to Ryan Howard ("Mike Schmidt Most Valuable Player Award"), J. A. Happ ("Steve Carlton Most Valuable Pitcher Award"), Jamie Moyer ("Dallas Green Special Achievement Award"), and Brad Lidge ("Tug McGraw Good Guy Award").

Rubén Amaro, Jr., was named the "This Year in Baseball Awards" Executive of the Year and the Philadelphia Sports Writers Association Executive of the Year. He was also inducted into the Philadelphia Jewish Sports Hall of Fame.

The Phillie Phanatic was awarded the "Great Friend to Kids" Award by the Please Touch Museum (the Children's Museum of Philadelphia).

On December 9, 2009, Sports Illustrated named Chase Utley as the second baseman on its MLB All-Decade Team. On December 22, Sports Illustrated named Pat Gillick as number 7 on its list of the Top 10 GMs/Executives of the Decade (in all sports).

Regular season player statistics
All statistics are current through the 2009 regular season.

Batting

Note: G = Games played; AB = At bats; R = Runs scored; H = Hits; 2B = Doubles; 3B = Triples; HR = Home runs; RBI = Runs batted in; AVG = Batting average; SB = Stolen bases

Note: Pitchers batting stats are included above.

Pitching

Note: W = Wins; L = Losses; ERA = Earned run average; G = Games pitched; GS = Games started; SV = Saves; IP = Innings pitched; R = Runs allowed; ER = Earned runs allowed; BB = Walks allowed; K = Strikeouts

Broadcasting

Over-the-air television returned to WPHL-TV (My PHL 17) for a three-year period after a ten-year stint at WPSG-TV (CW 57), when the Phillies and the Tribune Broadcasting station signed a three-year contract on November 19, 2008. This marks the third time the station has become the territorial flagship station, the first being from 1971 to 1982—as the successor to WFIL-TV Channel 6 (now WPVI-TV)—and again from 1993 to 1998. Between those dates, games were telecast by WTXF-TV Channel 29 (known as WTAF-TV from 1983 through 1987 and prior to becoming a Fox–owned-and-operated station).

Tom McCarthy, Chris Wheeler, and Gary Matthews are the current members of the television broadcast team. McCarthy took over full-time play-by-play duties from Harry Kalas after his death in mid-April 2009. Wheeler is the color commentator for the first and last three innings of each game, while Matthews does color commentary in the middle three innings. On the radio, Scott Franzke and Larry Andersen are the play-by-play and color commentators, respectively, for the English language broadcasts on WPHT-AM (1210), while Danny Martinez and Bill Kulik provide the Spanish language commentary on WUBA (1480 AM).

The Phillies' postseason radio duties were split between the TV crew and the regular radio crew, while the television broadcasts on TBS were covered by Brian Anderson, Joe Simpson, and David Aldridge for the Division Series, and Chip Caray, Ron Darling, and Buck Martinez for the League Championship Series. The World Series broadcasters were Joe Buck and Tim McCarver on the Fox telecasts, and Joe Morgan and Jon Miller on ESPN Radio for the national broadcast.

Footnotes 
Lead
Statistical leaders must qualify by Major League Baseball's criteria to be considered "leaders".

Game log
Jayson Werth tied a franchise record by stealing four bases, including home plate, in the Phillies' 5–3 victory over the Dodgers.
The Phillies tied a franchise record by scoring ten runs in the first inning, and set season highs in hits (21) and runs scored (22). The 22 runs was the fifth-most in franchise history and was the biggest defeat in the history of the opposing Cincinnati Reds franchise.
Eric Bruntlett turned the 15th unassisted triple play in the modern era of Major League Baseball history. It was the second in Phillies history (Mickey Morandini) and the second game-ending unassisted triple play (Johnny Neun, 1927).
The attendance figure is unavailable (listed as "0") for game one of the doubleheader.

Farm system 

LEAGUE CHAMPIONS: Lakewood

References 
General

Inline citations

External links

2009 Philadelphia Phillies season at Baseball Reference
Philadelphia Phillies' official website

Philadelphia Phillies seasons
National League East champion seasons
National League champion seasons
Philadelphia Phillies
Philadelphia Phillies